Centrorumis is a monospecific genus of velvet worm containing the single species Centrorumis trigona. This species has 15 pairs of legs in both sexes. It is found in New South Wales, Australia.

References

Further reading

Onychophorans of Australasia
Onychophoran genera
Monotypic protostome genera
Fauna of New South Wales
Endemic fauna of Australia
Taxa named by Amanda Reid (malacologist)